Forensic Files is an American documentary-style series which reveals how forensic science is used to solve violent crimes, mysterious accidents, and even outbreaks of illness.  The show is broadcast on truTV, narrated by Peter Thomas, and produced by Medstar Television, in association with truTV Original Productions. It has broadcast 406 episodes since its debut on TLC in 1996 as Medical Detectives.

This was the final season of the show for almost a decade. Its last episode ("Expert Witness") aired on June 17, 2011. Series executive producer Paul Dowling once ruled out the possibility of reviving the series, as he considered series narrator Peter Thomas, who died on April 30, 2016, irreplaceable. The series was revived in 2020 as Forensic Files II, with new episodes beginning on February 23.

Episodes

References

External links
 Forensic Files episodes on TV Guide
 

14